American Heartbreak is the third studio album by American singer-songwriter Zach Bryan, released on May 20, 2022, through Belting Bronco and Warner Records. It is a triple album and Bryan's major-label debut. The album was preceded by six singles, including Bryan's most successful single to date, "Something in the Orange", which reached number 10 on the US Billboard Hot 100. Bryan toured the US until November 2022 in support of the record.

Background
Bryan explained that the album "explores the past five years" of his life, further calling it his "effort at trying to explain what being a 26-year-old man in America is like. There's love, loss, revelry, resentment, and forgiveness all wrapped into one piece of work". The Tennessean wrote that the album ranges "from demo-like ruminations to full-fledged heartland rock anthems" as well as an "untamed restlessness and blurry-eyed angst".

Commercial performance
American Heartbreak debuted at number five on the US Billboard 200 with 71,500 album-equivalent units, including 6,000 pure album sales, making it the biggest first week for a country album in 2022. On the day of its release, American Heartbreak achieved the most streams of any country album in 2022 on both Spotify and Apple Music. As of October 2022, the album has sold 702,000 album units in the U.S. alone.

Track listing
All tracks written by Zach Bryan except "You Are My Sunshine" (written by Jimmie Davis and Charles Mitchell).

Personnel
Adapted from liner notes.

Graham Bright – electric guitar (25), guitar solo (13, 14)
Zach Bryan – lead vocals (all tracks), acoustic guitar (1–5, 7, 8, 10–18, 20–34), bass drum (6, 29), electric guitar (6, 9, 16, 19), harmonica (5–7, 13, 15, 24), slide guitar (11, 21, 29)
Caleb Buchfink – background vocals (23)
Dune Butler – Fender Jazz Bass (25), Juno synth (25), Moog synth (25), upright bass (25)
J.R. Carroll – percussion (25), background vocals (3, 13–15, 25, 27)
Taylor Carroll – percussion (25)
Aksel Coe – drums (2–5, 7–12, 14–22, 24, 26–28, 30–33), percussion (3, 5, 7, 9, 13, 14, 16–19, 21, 24, 26), background vocals (13, 27, 30)
Whitney Coleman – background vocals (11)
Read Connolly – banjo (1), lap steel guitar (8), pedal steel guitar (3, 10, 19, 30), slide guitar (12)
Billy Contreras – fiddle (4, 9, 10, 17, 18, 28, 30–32)
Jeff Fielder – electric guitar (25), slide guitar (25)
Ryan Hadlock – percussion (25)
Calvin Knowles – bass guitar (4, 5, 7, 8, 14, 15, 17, 19–21, 24, 26, 30), synth bass (2, 11, 19), upright bass (2, 3, 10, 12, 13, 18, 22, 27, 28, 31–33), background vocals (13, 27)
William Map – drums (25), percussion (25)
Morgan Meinert – background vocals (7)
Kimo Muraki – baritone horn (25), mellophone (25)
Lucas Ruge-Jones – fiddle (15, 22, 23, 27), background vocals (22)
Eddie Spear – piano (19, 29), background vocals (13, 27)
Seth Taylor – acoustic guitar (3–5, 7–10, 13, 15, 17, 19–22, 24, 26, 27, 30, 31, 33), banjo (33), electric guitar (7–11, 14, 18–21, 26, 28, 31, 32), mandolin (12, 15, 27, 31, 32), background vocals (13, 22, 30)
Brooke Waggoner – piano (2, 10, 18)

Charts

Weekly charts

Year-end charts

References

2022 albums
Warner Records albums
Zach Bryan albums